Season 1977–78 was the 94th football season in which Dumbarton competed at a Scottish national level, entering the Scottish Football League for the 72nd time, the Scottish Cup for the 83rd time, and the Scottish League Cup for the 31st time.

Overview 
Dumbarton played league football in Division 1 for the third year running.  Davie Wilson's first season as manager began well, and while always up with the leading pack, it was to be the case that too many draws rather than wins would prevent a serious challenge on the title.  Nevertheless, a 4th-place finish was a creditable result.

In the Scottish Cup, Hearts were once again the opponents, but it was Dumbarton who were to progress this time after a drawn game.  In the quarter final, however Partick Thistle were to prove too good on the day.

In the League Cup, qualifying groups were dispensed with and replaced with straight knock-out ties on a home-and-away basis. It was however to prove a bit of an embarrassment when in the first round, a 4–1 home win against Hamilton was followed by a 6–0 away drubbing.

Locally, in the Stirlingshire Cup, Dumbarton were defeated by local rivals Clydebank in the semi final.

Results & fixtures

Scottish First Division

Scottish Cup

Scottish League Cup

Stirlingshire Cup

Pre-season/Other Matches

League table

Player statistics

Squad 

|}

International Caps
Murdo MacLeod and Graeme Sinclair were selected to play for the Scottish League in a match against an Italian League XI in Verona, which resulted in a 1–1 draw.

In addition Ally MacLeod was part of the Scottish Youth (under 19) side which competed in the UEFA Youth Championships.  He played in all seven matches, against Denmark (1-0 and 2–0), West Germany (1-0), Portugal (1-0), Italy (0-0), Yugoslavia (2-2) and Poland (1-3) - Scotland finished in 4th place.

Transfers

Players in

Players out

Reserve team
Dumbarton competed in the Scottish Reserve League First Division and finished 8th of 11.

In the Scottish Second XI Cup, Dumbarton lost to Ayr United in the first round, and in the Reserve League Cup, Dumbarton lost to Rangers, on aggregate, in the first round.

Trivia
  The League match against Arbroath on 20 August marked Jim Muir's 100th appearance for Dumbarton in all national competitions - the 74th Dumbarton player to reach this milestone.
 The League match against Airdrie on 14 September marked Ally Brown's 100th appearance for Dumbarton in all national competitions - the 75th Dumbarton player to reach this milestone.
 The League match against Hamilton on 25 February marked Laurie Williams's 300th appearance for Dumbarton in all national competitions - the 5th Dumbarton player to achieve this accolade.

See also
 1977–78 in Scottish football

References

External links
Martin Mowatt (Dumbarton Football Club Historical Archive)
Dave Govan (Dumbarton Football Club Historical Archive)
Scottish Football Historical Archive

Dumbarton F.C. seasons
Scottish football clubs 1977–78 season